An annular solar eclipse occurred on December 25, 1954, also known as "The Christmas 1954 solar eclipse". A solar eclipse occurs when the Moon passes between Earth and the Sun, thereby totally or partly obscuring the image of the Sun for a viewer on Earth. An annular solar eclipse occurs when the Moon's apparent diameter is smaller than the Sun's, blocking most of the Sun's light and causing the Sun to look like an annulus (ring). An annular eclipse appears as a partial eclipse over a region of the Earth thousands of kilometers wide. Annularity was visible from the southwestern tip of South West Africa (Now Namibia), Union of South Africa (Now South Africa), Ashmore and Cartier Islands except Cartier Island, Indonesia and Portuguese Timor (Now East Timor).

Related eclipses

Solar eclipses of 1953–1956

Saros 131

Metonic series

References
Notes

Sources

1954 12 25
1954 in science
1954 12 25
December 1954 events